Dashtak-e Olya (also Romanized as Dashtak-e ‘Olyā; also known as Dashtak-e Bālā) is a village in Atrak Rural District, Maneh District, Maneh and Samalqan County, North Khorasan Province, Iran. At the 2006 census, its population was 1,229, in 239 families.

References 

Populated places in Maneh and Samalqan County